Little Sauk Lake is a lake in Todd County, in the U.S. state of Minnesota.

Little Sauk Lake was named for a colony of Sauk Indians who lived in the area.

See also
List of lakes in Minnesota

References

Lakes of Minnesota
Lakes of Todd County, Minnesota